Lipstick Jungle may refer to:

 Lipstick Jungle (novel), a novel by Candace Bushnell
 Lipstick Jungle (TV series), an American drama series based on the novel
 A song by Newton Faulkner from the album Rebuilt by Humans